Róża Kajzer (3 September 1909 – 10 July 1977) was a Polish swimmer. She competed in the women's 200 metre breaststroke event at the 1928 Summer Olympics.

References

External links
 

1909 births
1977 deaths
Polish female breaststroke swimmers
Olympic swimmers of Poland
Swimmers at the 1928 Summer Olympics
Sportspeople from Zabrze
20th-century Polish women